The 6th government of Turkey (27 September 1930 – 5 May 1931)  was a short lived government in the history of Turkey. It is also called the fifth İnönü government.

Background 
After the formation of an opposition party in the parliament (Liberal Republican Party), prime minister İsmet İnönü of the Republican People's Party (CHP) decided to renew his cabinet.

The government
In the list below, the  cabinet members who served only a part of the cabinet's lifespan are shown in the column "Notes". 

In 1930-1931, surnames were not yet in use in Turkey, which would remain true until the Surname Law. The surnames given in the list are the surnames the members of the cabinet assumed after 1934.

Aftermath
Following the elections held on 4 May 1931, İnönü resigned, but also founded the next government.

References

06
Republican People's Party (Turkey) politicians
1930 establishments in Turkey
1931 disestablishments in Turkey
Cabinets established in 1930
Cabinets disestablished in 1931
Members of the 6th government of Turkey
3rd parliament of Turkey
Republican People's Party (Turkey)